The Narmada Canal is a contour canal in Western India that brings water from the Sardar Sarovar Dam to the state of Gujarat and then into Rajasthan state. It is the second longest canal in India (after the Indira Gandhi Canal) and the largest canal by water carrying capacity (40,000 cusec at source). The main canal is connected with 42 branch canals providing irrigation to  farmland (about 18 lakh hectares in Gujarat and 2.5 lakh hectares in Rajasthan). The canal is designed to transfer  water annually from the Narmada Basin to areas under other river basins in Gujarat and Rajasthan. (9 MAF for Gujarat and 0.5 MAF for Rajasthan).

Soon after the completion of the construction project, the Narmada canal was inaugurated on 24 April 2008. It has carrying capacity of 40,000 cubic foot per second (cfs or cusec) at its head in Navagam and is decreased to 2,600 cusecs at Sanchore. On the way, Narmada main canal crosses many rivers and water bodies. The main canal itself can hold 220 MCM (Million cubic metre) of water at full supply depth. It is designed not only for the water supply but also the storage of water to improve the response time of the system.

Irrigation in Gujarat
The main canal has 38 branches in Gujarat.

Saurashtra Branch Canal 
Subsequently, in the 59 to 104.46 km span it has five pumping stations to pump the water  up before tailing into Bhogavo - II reservoir.

Irrigation in Rajasthan
Although the Narmada River does not flow through Rajasthan and no area of Rajasthan falls in the Narmada basin, considerations were made to irrigate its lands with the water from the Narmada River that flows through the neighboring state of Gujarat, to encourage peasants to settle in the areas along the international border with Pakistan. After traversing  in Gujarat, the Narmada canal enters Rajasthan near Shilu in the Sanchor tehsil of Jalore. In total, it was designed to irrigate  in 233 villages in Jalore and Barmer and provide drinking water to 1,336 villages.

The Narmada canal has a few unique features compared to other projects:
 Irrigation water is delivered to farmer groups, via Water Users Associations (WUA), not to individual farmers. WUAs are responsible for the operation and maintenance of field water canals.
 Micro-irrigation systems such as drip and sprinklers to be encouraged for efficient water usage.

Solar panels

Solar canals are being installed along a  pilot project section of the Sanand Branch Canal near Chandrasan village to generate  of electricity.

See also
 Indira Gandhi Canal is the longest canal of India
 Lower Bhavani Project Canal
 Ganga Canal (Rajasthan)
 List of canals in India

Further reading 

 Sardar Sarovar Project – The Engineering Marvel - Narmada Main Canal

References

Narmada River
Canals in India
Canals opened in 2008